Piirissaare Parish was the smallest (by population) rural municipality in Tartu County, Estonia, consisting of the Piirissaar island in Lake Peipus. The island is known for its beautiful nature. There are many rare species such as the common spadefoot toad, green toad, little gull, black tern, white-tailed eagle, European bullhead, Petasites spurius and muskrat. It is the most important wildlife preserve for amphibians in Estonia.

Government (vallavalitsus) and Parliament (vallavolikogu)

Vallavolikogu  
The parliament of Piirissaar (Piirissaare vallavolikogu) had 7 members. Three of them are belonging to Valimisliit Kodupaik (VK) and four members are from Estonian second largest party Estonian Center Party (KE).

Settlements
There are 3 villages on Piirissaar: Piiri, Saare and Tooni.

References

External links
 
Unofficial website 
360-Degree Airiel Panorama of Piirissaar from Helicopter

Populated places in Tartu County
Former municipalities of Estonia